The following elections occurred in the year 1883.

Africa
 1883 Liberian general election

Europe
 1883 Croatian parliamentary by-election
 1883 Dalmatian parliamentary election
 1883 Dutch general election

North America

Canada
 1883 Manitoba general election
 1883 Ontario general election

United States
 1883 New York state election

See also
 :Category:1883 elections

1883
Elections